Lieutenant General Charles Brisbane Ewart  (15 May 1827 – 8 August 1903) was a British Army officer who became Lieutenant Governor of Jersey.

Life

He was the son of Lt General John Frederick Ewart and his wife, Lavinia Brisbane, daughter of the military hero, Charles Brisbane. His brother was General Sir John Alexander Ewart.

Ewart was commissioned into the Royal Engineers in 1845. He fought at the Battles of Alma, Balaclava and Inkerman as well as the Siege of Sevastopol during the Crimean War.

He was appointed Deputy Director of Works for Barracks in 1872 and a Member of the Ordnance Committee in 1884. He took part in the Sudan Expedition in 1885 and became Lieutenant Governor of Jersey in 1887 before retiring in 1894.

Ewart was appointed Colonel commandant of the Royal Engineers on 30 March 1902, succeeding General Sir Andrew Clarke.

Family
In 1860 he married his second cousin, Emily Jane Ewart; they had three sons and two daughters.

References

1827 births
1903 deaths
British Army lieutenant generals
Companions of the Order of the Bath
Royal Engineers officers
Governors of Jersey
British Army personnel of the Crimean War